The Property and Freedom Society (PFS) is an anarcho-capitalist political organization located in Bodrum, Turkey. Founded in May 2006 under the stewardship of Hans-Hermann Hoppe, a Rothbardian political theorist and Professor Emeritus of Economics at the University of Nevada, Las Vegas Business School, PFS presents itself as a more radically right-libertarian alternative to the free-market Mont Pelerin Society. 

The PFS holds annual conferences where paleolibertarian and paleoconservative intellectuals deliver speeches and exchange ideas in what Hoppe suggests is a "political correctness-free zone".

Mission

On the fifth anniversary of PFS, Hoppe reflected on its goals: 
On the one hand, positively, it was to explain and elucidate the legal, economic, cognitive and cultural requirements and features of a free, state-less natural order.
On the other hand, negatively, it was to unmask the State and showcase it for what it really is: an institution run by gangs of murderers, plunderers, and thieves, surrounded by willing executioners, propagandists, sycophants, crooks, liars, clowns, charlatans, dupes and useful idiots – an institution that dirties and taints everything it touches.

Annual conferences 
Conferences have been held annually since 2006, in Bodrum, Turkey. Since 2013 they have been held in September, instead of in May as in the previous years. 

The PFS annual meeting explicitly aims to promote discrimination as logical choice, affirming individual responsibility - attracting growing support from intellectuals and entrepreneurs from around the globe due to their purported realisation that there is no practical difference between discrimination and choice. In addition to the formal proceedings of the conferences, there are integrated activities such as a boat trip into the Aegean Sea, excursions to local fishing villages, and firework displays followed by gala nights.
The evolution of the nature of the conferences was described in a talk on the History of the Property and Freedom Society in 2015 at the 10th Anniversary Meeting.

Records of meetings 
Records of all meetings of the Property and Freedom Society have been made publicly available online.

Allegations of racism
PFS has garnered controversy for including speakers such as Jared Taylor, Richard Lynn, and Richard Spencer.

Noting the racialist affiliations of Richard Lynn and Jared Taylor, the Southern Poverty Law Center condemned the PFS as a "serious academic racist event" populated by the "movers and shakers" of the racialist movement. A May 11, 2007 Las Vegas Review-Journal article described the Anti-Defamation League's criticism of PFS and noted that Lynn has described black people as "more psychopathic than whites".

A 2013 Anti-Defamation League report about "increased cooperation" between European and American racists referred to Taylor as a white supremacist and cited his appearance at the 2013 PFS conference.

References

External links 
 Property and Freedom Society

Organizations established in 2006
Anarcho-capitalist organizations
Libertarian think tanks
Paleolibertarianism
Paleoconservatism
Austrian School